John Meagher (born 26 August 1995) is an Irish sportsperson.  He plays hurling with his local club Loughmore–Castleiney and with the Tipperary senior inter-county team since 2015.

Career
Meagher  was named in the Tipperary squad for the 2015 National Hurling League and made his league debut on 22 February against Galway when he came on as a late substitute.

Career statistics

Club

Hurling

Football

Inter-county

Hurling

Football

Honours
Loughmore–Castleiney
Tipperary Senior Hurling Championship (2): 2013, 2021
Tipperary Senior Football Championship (4): 2013, 2014, 2016, 2021
Mid Tipperary Senior Hurling Championship (3): 2011, 2016, 2018
Mid Tipperary Senior Football Championship (5): 2012, 2015, 2016, 2017, 2018

Tipperary
All-Ireland Minor Football Championship (1): 2011
Munster Minor Football Championship (1): 2011

References

External links
Tipperary GAA Player Profile

Tipperary inter-county hurlers
Loughmore-Castleiney hurlers
Living people
1995 births